Ulysses L. Houston was a pastor and state legislator in Georgia. He was elected to the Georgia State Legislature in 1868, 
and was an influential organizer in Savannah, Georgia's African-American community during the mid-19th century.

He was born a slave in Grahamville, South Carolina, and was taken by his master Moses Henderson to Savannah, where he served as a house servant. According to the book Redeeming the South religious cultures and racial identities among Southern Baptists: "He learned to read from white sailors while he worked in the city's hospital and earned money by hiring out his time." Licensed to preach in 1855, he was the pastor of the Third African Baptist Church (later renamed the First Bryan Baptist Church) in Savannah, Georgia, a congregation of about 400, from 1861 to 1889. He was twice president of the black Baptist convention in Georgia.

Houston was one of the Original 33 African American legislators of the Reconstruction era in Georgia, expelled or forced to resign. He was also one of the 16 freedmen church leaders who met with Union General William Tecumseh Sherman in 1865.

See also
First Bryan Baptist Church
African-American officeholders during and following the Reconstruction era

References

African-American Baptist ministers
African-American activists
Original 33
African-American politicians during the Reconstruction Era
People from Jasper County, Georgia
African-American state legislators in Georgia (U.S. state)
People from Jasper County, South Carolina